Michael Phillip "Rifle" DeLong (March 15, 1945 – July 27, 2018) was a United States Marine Corps lieutenant general who served as deputy commander, United States Central Command, MacDill Air Force Base, Florida. From 2000 until his retirement in 2003 (with over 36 years of service), DeLong was second-in-command to General Tommy Franks, who, as commander of United States Central Command, was in charge of the war on terror, including Operation Iraqi Freedom in Iraq and Operation Enduring Freedom in Afghanistan.

Biography
DeLong was a graduate of the United States Naval Academy and held a master's degree in industrial management from Central Michigan University.

DeLong's operational assignments include tours with HMM-262, Quang Tri, Republic of Vietnam; Standardization Instructor, HT-18, Naval Aviation Training Command; maintenance officer, HML-367, where he participated in Operation Eagle Pull, the evacuation of Phnom Penh and Operation Frequent Wind the evacuation of Saigon; operations officer, Marine Heavy Helicopter Squadron (HMH); officer-in-charge, HML 367, Detachment C; executive officer and special projects officer, Marine Air Base Squadron 24; plans and operations officer, Marine Air Group 36; executive officer and commanding officer, Marine Air Group 30; executive officer, MAG-26; commanding officer, HMM-266; executive officer and commanding officer, Marine Aviation Weapons/Tactics Squadron 1 (MAWTS-1), where he participated in Operations Desert Shield/Desert Storm; assistant chief of staff, operations, 3rd Marine Aircraft Wing, where he served as the Joint Force Air Component Commander (JFACC) for Operation Restore Hope in Somalia; deputy commanding general, I Marine Expeditionary Force, Marine Corps Base Camp Pendleton, California; deputy commander and acting commander, United States Marine Corps Forces Atlantic, in Norfolk, Virginia, and his previous duty as commander, 3rd Marine Air Wing, Marine Corps Air Station Miramar, California.
His principal staff assignments include officer-in-charge, Fleet Marine Force, Pacific Command Center; Intelligence Requirements Officer, Fleet Marine Force, Pacific; aide-de-camp to the deputy commander, Fleet Marine Force, Pacific; arms control/strategic weapons action officer in the Strategic Requirements Branch of the Plans Division, Headquarters Marine Corps; and the director for joint training (J-7) and director of Joint Training Analyses and Simulation Center, U.S. Atlantic Command. DeLong's professional education includes the Basic School, Naval Flight School, Amphibious Warfare School, Defense Intelligence School, Armed Forces Staff College, Army War College and a Defense Department fellowship at the Brookings Institution. DeLong also held an honorary Doctor of Strategic Intelligence from the Joint Military Intelligence College.

DeLong's personal decorations include: two awards of the Defense Distinguished Service Medal, two awards of the Defense Superior Service Medal, two awards of the Legion of Merit, two awards of the Distinguished Flying Cross, two awards of the Meritorious Service Medal, Air Medal with Flight Strike Numerals 69, Navy Achievement Medal and the Combat Action Ribbon. DeLong logged more than 5,600 flight hours in all models of aircraft and more than 800 combat hours.
DeLong died of a heart attack in Treasure Island, Florida on July 27, 2018, at the age of 73. He will be buried at Arlington National Cemetery in Virginia.

References

External links

1945 births
2018 deaths
United States Marine Corps generals
Recipients of the Legion of Merit
United States Marine Corps personnel of the Vietnam War
United States Marine Corps personnel of the Iraq War
United States Marine Corps personnel of the War in Afghanistan (2001–2021)
Central Michigan University alumni
United States Naval Academy alumni
Recipients of the Air Medal
Recipients of the Distinguished Flying Cross (United States)
Recipients of the Defense Superior Service Medal
Recipients of the Defense Distinguished Service Medal